Gadsden may refer to:

Places 
Gadsden, Alabama
Gadsden Depot, a United States Army Depot in the city of Gadsden, Alabama
Gadsden, Arizona
Gadsden, Indiana
Gadsden, South Carolina
Gadsden, Tennessee
Gadsden County, Florida
Gadsden Independent School District, New Mexico

People 
James Gadsden (1788–1858), American statesman and namesake of the Gadsden Purchase
Christopher Gadsden (1724–1805), American soldier and statesman
Ernie Gadsden (1895–1966), English footballer
Oronde Gadsden (born 1971), American football player
Peter Gadsden (1929–2006), British chartered engineer and Lord Mayor of London
William Gadsden (1910–1995), South African cricketer

Other uses 
Gadsden Purchase
Gadsden flag